"You Take My Breath Away" is the debut single by singer-actor Rex Smith and the first release from his third studio album Sooner or Later which is also featured in the 1979 made-for-television film of the same title starring Smith and Denise Miller. It was produced by Charles Calello and Stephen Lawrence, and written by Lawrence and Bruce Hart.

Charts
The song reached number ten on the U.S. Billboard Hot 100 in 1979 for two weeks (dated on June 23) and spent two weeks at number seven on the Cash Box Top 100.  It also peaked at number 11 on the Adult Contemporary chart. The song was certified Gold.  In Canada, "You Take My Breath Away" reached as high as number three on the Pop chart and number one on the Adult Contemporary chart. It peaked at #27 in New Zealand.

Weekly charts

Year-end charts

References

1979 songs
1979 debut singles
Rex Smith songs
Columbia Records singles
Songs written for films
Songs written by Bruce Hart (songwriter)
Songs with music by Stephen J. Lawrence